George Logan was a collegiate soccer head coach. From 1968 to 1981, he served as the first head men's soccer coach at San Diego State University, where he compiled a 148-48-17(.735) record. His winning percentage ranks 16th all-time among NCAA Division 1 coaches. In 14 seasons, he never had a losing season.

He was also a very successful high school soccer coach. He coached at Valhalla High School near San Diego, where he compiled a 298-74-37 record in 16 seasons. The team reached the San Diego Section championship game eight times, winning it five times. Between 1987 and 1990, Valhalla went on a 53-match unbeaten streak. Valhalla won 10 league titles and made the playoffs 15 times.

He died April 19, 2009, at age 76. He is considered by many the "Father of San Diego soccer." His brother is called Will Logan, and is a psychology student.

External links
http://goaztecs.cstv.com/sports/m-soccer/spec-rel/041309aaa.html
http://www.signonsandiego.com/news/2009/apr/01/1s1soccer23056-legion-sings-praises-sds-father-soc/?zIndex=75616
http://articles.latimes.com/1992-03-23/sports/sp-3024_1_head-coach

1930s births
2009 deaths
San Diego State Aztecs men's soccer coaches
Place of birth missing
Soccer players from San Diego
Date of birth missing